Casino is a 1980 American made-for-television adventure film directed by Don Chaffey and starring Mike Connors, Barry Van Dyke and Gene Evans. It originally premiered on ABC on August 1, 1980.

Plot
Nick is a suave and sophisticated gambler who owns a floating hotel and gambling ship, which is plagued by sabotage on its maiden voyage.

Cast
Mike Connors as Nick
Barry Van Dyke as Edge
Gene Evans as Captain K L Fitzgerald
Hedley Mattingly as Foxworth
Gary Burghoff as Bill Taylor
Joseph Cotten as Ed Booker
Lynda Day George as Carol
Bo Hopkins as Stoney
Robert Loggia as Karl Hauptman
Robert Reed as Darius
Barry Sullivan as Sam Fletcher
Sherry Jackson as Jennifer

Production
The story was inspired by Mr Lucky. Star Mike Connors originally envisioned a grittier version with the floating casino being run down. However, the success of The Love Boat prompted the final version to be more glamorous.

References

External links
Casino at TCMDB
Casino at IMDb

1980 television films
1980 films
1980s adventure drama films
ABC network original films
American adventure drama films
Films about gambling
Films scored by Mark Snow
Films produced by Aaron Spelling
Films directed by Don Chaffey
1980s English-language films
American drama television films
1980s American films